Take the High Road (renamed High Road from 1994 to 2003) was a Scottish soap opera produced by Scottish Television, which started in February 1980 as an ITV network daytime programme, and was broadcast until 2003. It was set in the fictional village of Glendarroch, and exteriors were filmed in the real-life village of Luss on the banks of Loch Lomond.

The series was dropped by most ITV stations in the 1990s – the Scottish, Grampian, Border and Ulster stations continued to screen it until the last episode. From April 2020, the entire series is being made available free to view on the STV Player app.

History

Origins
In 1979, the ITV network decided that its daytime schedule would be improved by the inclusion of a soap opera set in Scotland. At the time the only soap opera being made by any of the three Scottish regional companies was Scottish Television's Garnock Way, set in a Central Belt mining community not far from Glasgow. It had been running in Scotland for three years and was very popular there, but the network rejected it because they wanted, in their words, "lots of Scotch Lochs and Hills". It was decided that a new programme would be made which had its central core in a rural, lochside setting where the community were all part of an estate, comprising a village and several farms. As Michael Elder puts it, the series would have a romantic background against which a practical story of everyday events would be set.

The original name for the fictitious estate and village was Glendhu and the proposed title for the programme was The Glendhu Factor. The network did not like this, because viewers in other ITV regions may have had difficulty with both the placename and the role of factor. As a result, the village was renamed Glendarroch. In Scotland, a factor is a person responsible for managing an estate, but the word has other connotations elsewhere.

Location filming for a pilot had been done in and around the village of Luss on the western shore of Loch Lomond, overlooked by Ben Lomond. The popular song "The Bonnie Banks o' Loch Lomond" contains the line, "O ye'll tak' the high road, and I'll tak' the low road" and so the title High Road, Low Road was suggested, but this was also dropped after someone pointed out that, said quickly, "it sounds like a Chinese takeaway". After some debate it was decided that the series would be called Take the High Road.

In late 1979, partly because of an ITV strike at the time, Garnock Way was axed, and production began on the new programme.

Links to Garnock Way
Take the High Road was introduced as a replacement for Garnock Way, which contained very similar characters and actors to the original characters of Take the High Road. Some viewers were rather displeased about Garnock Way being axed; to help defuse some of the anger, Todd the garage mechanic, played by Bill Henderson, would suffer a nervous breakdown, and would move north to set up business on his own to help resolve his alcohol problems.

Because of shortage of time and the wish to keep most of the existing actors, it did not follow this plan. The appointed producer Clarke Tait decided to have a scenario where Henderson's character, Todd, had his name changed to Ken Calder who happened to be a garage mechanic with a drink problem.

Production and changes

The main writer was series creator Don Houghton. Many of the early scripts were written by Michael Elder, who also played Dr Wallace in the show. Books by the same name as the show were also produced by him. Until 1986, the series only broadcast 40 weeks of the year, with a break usually from January to the spring. 
 
During the course of its existence, Take the High Road went through some major changes and face lifts. Perhaps the most noticeable was the renovation of Blair's store: at first, everything was kept behind the counter as was once common practice; in series two, soon after Brian Blair was released from prison, it was transformed into a walk-around store. A few themes in Take the High Road were broadly in line with Scottish culture – for example, the relationships between crofters like Dougal Lachlan, villagers like storekeeper Isabel Blair, the "lady laird" Elizabeth Cunningham and the estate factor, originally Alan McIntyre. The Protestant religion was a recurring traditional theme and the series highlighted the remoteness of the village and estate. Several storylines focused on the difficulties of access faced by agencies such as the health service and the police, as when an RAF helicopter had to be summoned to Ardvain for Grace Lachlan following her near-fatal heart attack.

Elizabeth's family had historically (but no longer) owned the estate, the village and the neighbouring crofts and farms. Though still resident in the "Big House", Elizabeth protected the interests of her people but lack of revenue had forced her to sell the estate to Max Langemann's multinational business consortium. As the series began, Elizabeth was battling to resist Langemann's ruthless plan to convert Glendarroch into a leisure resort for his rich clientele. In 2005, this scenario was echoed in real life when American businessman Donald Trump bought an Aberdeenshire estate to build a controversial golf resort.

Despite her resistance to Langemann, Elizabeth understood that modernity was coming and was willing to accept it on terms favourable to the estate and its people. Her traditional mindset, however, contrasted sharply with those of her successors. In the first series, realising the need for new ideas to raise revenue, Elizabeth encouraged her daughter Fiona to join forces with Isabel's son Jimmy in launching a water-skiing enterprise on the loch.

In March 1990, the series was revamped in a bid to attract a younger audience, which resulted in some outcry about the changes and a belief that new sets had taken away the authenticity of a Scottish village. However, within six months, the changes were hailed as a success and enabled stronger story lines, and the introduction of  five new male characters.

During its run, Take the High Road was always one of the highest-rated television programmes in Scotland, and had an extremely loyal following throughout the rest of the UK. Indeed, when the series was cancelled by the ITV Network, so many protests were received from viewers in England that some ITV regions reinstated the programme. Starting from 22 July 1994, the series' name was changed to just High Road, until it was cancelled in April 2003.

Outcome
Take the High Road was the only soap for the ITV network which was not made by one of the "Big Five" companies. This helped to give Scotland a place on the network and also provide sufficient revenue to help STV to produce more programmes for ITV and Channel 4.

Cast and characters

Series 1 episodes

Broadcasting

STV series
Dates are for Scottish Television, which on some occasions was ahead of the ITV network daytime showing. 
 Series 1: 19 February 1980 – 28 May 1980: episodes 1–30
 Series 2: 14 October 1980 – 7 January 1981: episodes 31–56 
 Series 3: 7 April 1981 – 2 July 1981: episodes 57–82
 Series 4: 6 October 1981 – 18 March 1982: episodes 83–126
 Series 5: 24 August 1982 – 23 December 1982: episodes 127–162
 Series 6: 5 July 1983 – 20 March 1984: episodes 163–234
 Series 7: 4 September 1984 – 7 February 1985: episodes 235–276
 Series 8: 14 May 1985 – 28 November 1985: episodes 277–334
 Series 9: 18 March 1986 – 18 December 1986 to episodes 335–415
 2 February 1987 – 27 April 2003: episodes 416–1517.

From February 1987 onward, the series was broadcast all year round twice a week. In May 1993 the series become weekly.  Later during the run, however, there were several gaps during which the series was not shown, although the storylines continued uninterrupted each time the series resumed. First major gap was from 12 September to 22 October 2000; from 16 April to 12 May 2001; from June to August 2001; from 24 September to 27 October 2001; from 18 February to 6 April 2002; from June to September 2002; and in February 2003.

Regional scheduling
Take the High Road was broadcast by all ITV companies when it started in 1980. Nearly all regions broadcast Take the High Road during the daytime, except for Scottish Television who broadcast the soap in the early evenings around 7.00pm, instead of Emmerdale. From 1984 Border Television moved the series to a peak-time slot. Grampian Television did the same too in September 1987.

Dropped by the ITV network
During 1993, the new ITV network centre was reviewing all long-standing series made by ITV companies, the issues of the series being dropped becoming even more apparent as the regions south of the border were months behind in their transmissions in Scotland. On 2 June 1993, Marcus Plantin, ITV's network director, announced the termination of Take The High Road from September 1993, as 'ITV's statisticians believed English audiences have had enough'. This resulted in public protest, as many believed that without ITV companies south of the border, the series had no chance. The issue was raised in parliament under early day motions, and the Daily Record newspaper held a protest as well.

By the end of June, Scottish Television decided to continue producing the series mainly for the Scottish market, on a weekly basis. Shortly afterwards nearly all the ITV companies decided to keep the series going expect for Carlton, Central, Tyne Tees and Yorkshire, who all dropped the series from 7 September 1993. Carlton reinstated the series from 16 October 1993, and Central did the same on 5 November 1993 after viewers complained about the show being dropped in the first place. Only two companies refused to reinstate the series: Tyne Tees Television and Yorkshire Television, although both finally brought the series back in early 1996, starting from where they left off.

From 1995 onwards the number of ITV areas broadcasting the soap gradually reduced, however some did complete the series:

 Anglia Television and Meridian television until Christmas 1995
 Yorkshire, Tyne Tess, HTV and Granada Television until Christmas 1997. 
 Carlton Television until Christmas 1998
 Central and Westcountry until Friday 24 May 2002.
 Border Television completed the series in 2003.
 UTV who completed the series in 2004.

International
Take the High Road was broadcast in a number of countries around the world, including, Canada, United States, New Zealand.  In Australia, it was broadcast on ABC1, In Ireland, the series was broadcast during the daytime five days a week from the beginning on RTÉ One.  As episodes caught up with the UK transmissions, the number of episodes broadcast per week was reduced.

Repeats

Take the High Road was repeated on Sky Soap; the episodes shown in early 1997 were from the beginning, and 1989 episodes were being shown when the channel ended in April 1999. Early episodes from about 1994–95 were shown on Sky Scottish in 1997/98. It was repeated briefly on Life One from February 2008. This channel began with episode 1000 from 1992 but it ceased broadcasting after only six weeks having shown only four episodes.

In the autumn of 2010, nearly every episode (except for 23) were added to YouTube by Scottish Television, making the series accessible to viewers across the world. The series was removed from YouTube when it began repeating on STV new local channel called STV Glasgow from 3 June 2014 broadcasting one episode each weekday, with omnibus at the weekends, The series was also shown on STV Edinburgh from its launch in January 2015.  When STV Glasgow & STV Edinburgh were renamed STV2, the series was moved to a Saturday morning between 9am and 11am until June 2018, when the STV2 channel closed down.  STV continued to make the series available online via the STV Player, from the same point where STV2 left off. Five episodes were uploaded every week from 8 July 2018 on Sundays. From 14 September 2019 this increased to five episodes each Saturday and five episodes each Sunday. This run ended after the final episodes were uploaded on 18 April 2020.

Current availability
Starting on 26 April 2020, STV began a complete rerun of the programme by loading five episodes per week onto their STV Player app. They are free to view. Each block of five episodes remains available for six months, with the first five removed on 23 October 2020 and so on. Viewers can access the available episodes on mobile media by registering with STV Player and can watch them on television by linking their membership to the STV Freeview function.

As of 15 July 2021, a few selected episodes from the series are available on BritBox, a subscription only service curated by the BBC and ITV.

Sponsorship
Take the High Road was sponsored by Brooke Bond Scottish Blend tea from the beginning of 1992 until 1995 or 1996. Mother's Pride sponsored it from August 1999 to September 2001 on Scottish and Grampian TV. The sponsorship credits revealed the adventures of one man and his dog, Doug, as they searched for the village of Glendarroch. The STV Player rerun is being sponsored by Tunnock's bakery.

Books
These books were all written by Michael Elder, except for Summers Gloaming, which was written by Don Houghton:
 Summer's Gloaming (November 1982)
 Danger in the Glen (January 1984)
 Mist on the Moorland (1985)
 The Man From France (1986)
 The Last of the Lairds (May 1987)
 10 Years of Take the High Road (1990)

Theme tune

The theme tune was written by composer Arthur Blake, who was STV's Musical Director at the time, and there were four versions of it over the 23-year run. The first version was performed by Silly Wizard and was used until 1982. This version was quite "Scottish folk band" in style and pretty lively. Instruments featured included the accordion, banjo, drum kit, and synthesiser. The music for the closing credits featured a drum roll introduction. Silly Wizard performed another version which was released on record in 1980.

The "Silly Wizard" theme tune was replaced by an orchestral version from Esp 127 on 24 August 1982. The orchestral version was used from 1982 until episode 334 in 1985. Instruments featured included the oboe, clarinet, violin, and drum kit. While this version was in use, the music for the break strings tended to vary from episode to episode. Like the Silly Wizard version, the music for the closing credits also featured a drum roll introduction.

The third version was a different orchestral arrangement and was used from episode 335 in 1986 until episode 727 at the beginning of 1990. This new orchestral version was more violin led than the former, which had made more use of wind instruments, and featured no percussion.

From episode 728 in 1990, the fourth, rock-style, version made its debut and continued to be used until the end of the series. This version was electric guitar led (played by session guitarist Duncan Finlay) and featured percussion during the "middle" section. From 1994 when the programme name was shortened to High Road, the length of the closing credits was cut, so the closing theme was faded in just before the middle eight.

DVD releases
Take the High Road became available for the first time ever when distribution company Go Entertain commenced releasing the series in 2012 on DVD.

Rights to the series were later acquired by Alba Home Entertainment in 2013, with sets released in the same format, with the exception of each set now available with one disc. The series ceased releasing in 2014 after 16 volumes and 96 episodes, possibly due to poor sales. It is currently unknown if any future sets will become available.

In an unusual occurrence, the series was not rated by the BBFC for home video release, which is normally the case for all television series and films. It received an 'E' (Exempt from classification) rating, an unofficial rating only applied to documentaries or sports events released on home video.

Notes

References

Bibliography

External links
 
 

1980 Scottish television series debuts
1980s British television soap operas
1980s Scottish television series
1990s British television soap operas
1990s Scottish television series
2000s British television soap operas
2000s Scottish television series
2003 Scottish television series endings
British television soap operas
English-language television shows
ITV soap operas
Scottish television soap operas
Television shows produced by Scottish Television
Television shows set in Scotland